Lim Pisoth លឹម​ ពិសុទ្ធ​ (born 29 August 2001), is a Cambodian footballer currently playing as a midfielder for Phnom Penh Crown in the Cambodian League, and the Cambodia national team.

Career statistics

International

International goals

Honours

Club
Phnom Penh Crown
Cambodian Premier League: 2021, 2022
Cambodian Super Cup: 2022
Cambodian League Cup: 2022

References

External links
 

2001 births
Living people
Cambodian footballers
Cambodia international footballers
Association football midfielders
Phnom Penh Crown FC players
Sportspeople from Phnom Penh
Competitors at the 2021 Southeast Asian Games
Southeast Asian Games competitors for Cambodia